"Wine and Women" is a song written by Barry Gibb, and released by Barry Gibb and the Bee Gees in September 1965 on Leedon Records in Australia. The song's B-side was Follow the Wind. The single reached #19 in Australia, marking the Bee Gees' international chart debut. They achieved this by getting as many of their fans as possible to buy enough copies to get the song into the charts at #35 and, thus, to the attention of disc-jockeys.

Both songs were later included on the group's debut album The Bee Gees Sing and Play 14 Barry Gibb Songs, as well as the 1998 anthology of the group's Australian recordings Brilliant from Birth.

Wine and Women marked the first time Barry and Robin had traded lead vocals. Maurice plays the brief, lead guitar break, Barry's guitar strumming is mixed forward and he sings most of the lead vocals on this song. "Follow the Wind", despite being written by Barry, was sung by Robin.

Another important debut was that of Bill Shepherd in the producer's chair. Shepherd would travel with the group to England when they launched their international career and for many years arranged and conducted their orchestral backing on record and in concert.

Personnel
 Barry Gibb – lead vocals, rhythm guitar
 Robin Gibb – lead vocals
 Maurice Gibb – backing vocals, 12-string lead guitar
 Uncredited musician – drums

References

Bee Gees songs
1965 singles
Songs written by Barry Gibb
1965 songs
Leedon Records singles